Zümürxan (until 2008, Zümürxaç and Zyumyurkhach) is a village and municipality in the Barda Rayon of Azerbaijan.  It has a population of 1,307.

Notable natives 

 Aslan Vazirov — Hero of the Soviet Union.

References

Populated places in Barda District